Milad Esfini Farahani (born 26 June 1988) is an Iranian professional footballer. He currently plays for Shahr Khodro in the Persian Gulf Pro League.

Career
Farahani played for Paykan before moving to Damash Gilan in the summer of 2011.

References

External links
 Profile at Persianleague

Living people
1988 births
Iranian footballers
Niroye Zamini players
Damash Gilan players
Paykan F.C. players
Saba players
Naft Tehran F.C. players
Naft Masjed Soleyman F.C. players
Persian Gulf Pro League players
People from Karaj
Association football goalkeepers
Gol Gohar players
21st-century Iranian people